Catterick Racecourse, sometimes known as Catterick Bridge Racecourse, is a thoroughbred horse racing venue one mile north west of Catterick in North Yorkshire, England, near the hamlet of Catterick Bridge.  The first racing at Catterick was held in 1783.

The track is left-handed, sharp and undulating, just over a mile round, with a 3 furlong run-in.  The gravel subsoil means the going is usually good.  It has been said that "it is not one of the North's most glamorous fixtures".

The Catterick Sunday Market, held on the racecourse grounds, is the largest Sunday Market in the North of England.  The international flat racing champion Collier Hill won his first race here in March 2002.

The feature event at the course is the North Yorkshire Grand National held in January.

There are plans to create an All Weather track and change the layout of the National Hunt course.

History 

Horse racing and Yorkshire have long been bedfellows. Catterick hosted events in the mid-17th century in an unofficial capacity, with the first sanctioned meet taking place in 1783. A permanent track was laid down in 1813, and the course has been a mainstay of the Yorkshire racing scene since. Interest in the venue steadily grew in the early 20th Century, and by the early 1920s it was a staple of the area. This led to the formation of the Catterick Racecourse Company, who still manage the venue to this day.

Improvements continue to be made at Catterick, and while the events it hosts lack the prestige of some competing venues, it has made a contribution to racing history. Perhaps the most notable is the emergence of Collier Hill, a horse that went on to win the Hong Kong Vase, Irish St. Leger and Canadian International Stakes – all after first making his mark with victory at Catterick.

References

Bibliography

External links 

Catterick Bridge Racecourse (Official website)
 Website of the Catterick Sunday Market

Horse racing venues in England
Horse racing venues in Yorkshire
Sports venues in North Yorkshire
Sports venues completed in 1783
Catterick, North Yorkshire